
Gmina Wielbark is a rural gmina (administrative district) in Szczytno County, Warmian-Masurian Voivodeship, in northern Poland.

Villages
Gmina Wielbark contains the villages and settlements of Baranowo, Borki Wielbarskie, Ciemna Dąbrowa, Dąbrowa, Głuch, Jakubowy Borek, Jankowo, Jesionowiec, Kipary, Kołodziejowy Grąd, Kucbork, Łatana Mała, Łatana Wielka, Lejkowo, Lesiny Małe, Lesiny Wielkie, Łysak, Maliniak, Nowojowiec, Olędry, Ostrowy, Piwnice Wielkie, Przeździęk Mały, Przeździęk Wielki, Róklas, Sędrowo, Stachy, Szymanki, Wesołówko, Wesołowo, Wielbark, Wyżegi, Zabiele, Zapadki, Zieleniec and Zieleniec Mały.

Neighbouring gminas
Gmina Wielbark is bordered by the gminas of Chorzele, Czarnia, Janowo, Jedwabno, Rozogi and Szczytno.

References
Polish official population figures 2006

Wielbark
Szczytno County